Team "EuroStars" is an Elite European Ultimate (formerly "Ultimate frisbee") women's team formed from over 10 nations each year to challenge the top North American teams in the "Americus Pro Cup" and promote the European women's game.  The EuroStars provide an opportunity for these world class players to play in a strong team, learn about other cultures and promote female European talent. Founded in 2017 by captain Rebecca "Bex" Forth.
EuroStars Tour were shared in 6 simultaneous clinics in 6 different European countries. The "You’re a Star" clinics will happen each spring to increase outreach.

Americus Pro Cup has been run by American Ultimate Disc League (AUDL) and EuroStars since 2017. AUDL and EuroStars entered into a three-year partnership in 2018.

Pro Cup name
The name "Americus" is from the Latin name of Amerigo Vespucci (1454-1512); a feminine Latin form of his name was given to the continent of America.

Cup format
During Americus Pro Cup tournament team EuroStars are scheduled to play seven matches with strongest North American women Ultimate clubs.

Pro Cup tour follows official World Flying Disc Federation (WFDF) rules.
One game takes 100 minutes or until team reaches 15 points.

Pro Cup point system
wWin by 1 = 1 Pro Cup pointwin by 2 or 3 = 2 Pro Cup pointswin by 4+ = 3 Pro Cup points.

Team that has the greatest number of Pro Cup points after the last game in the season will win the "Americus Pro Cup" trophy.

2019 season

Game results

Team Europe: 14 pointsTeam Americas: 3 points

Team roster

2018 season

Game results

Team Europe: 12 pointsTeam Americas: 6 points

Team roster

2017 season

Game results

Team Europe: 9 pointsTeam Americas: 11 points

Team roster

References

External links

American Ultimate Disc League
Ultimate (sport) teams
Women's sports teams
Ultimate teams established in 2017